Amsterdam Airlines was a Dutch charter airline with its head office in Schiphol-Rijk on the grounds of Amsterdam Airport Schiphol in Haarlemmermeer, Netherlands. Founded in 2007, Amsterdam Airlines used to provide both charter and wet lease services. It ceased its operation on October 31, 2011 and went bankrupt on November 22 of the same year.

Fleet
At the time of closure, Amsterdam Airlines' fleet consisted of 3 aircraft:

Amsterdam Airlines' first aircraft, an Airbus A320, arrived at Schiphol on 18 June 2008 from Mexico City via Gander, Canada. The aircraft (MSN 430), was on lease from ILFC, and is registered PH-AAX. Their second aircraft, registration PH-AAY (MSN 527), entered service mid-2009 and a third aircraft, registration PH-AAZ (MSN 299) was delivered on 18 April 2011. Two aircraft have been returned to their lessors. The flights are taken over by ML Tours Strategic Airlines but at the moment Corendon Nederland Airlines NLD operates these flights.

References

External links

Amsterdam Airlines official website

Defunct airlines of the Netherlands
Defunct charter airlines
Airlines established in 2007
Airlines disestablished in 2011
Dutch companies established in 2007
2011 disestablishments in the Netherlands